The Harp Concerto by Alberto Ginastera was first performed in 1965. It was promoted in the 1950s by Edna Phillips, the harpist of the Philadelphia Orchestra. Philips had retired by the time the work was ready to be premiered, and the solo part was played by the Spanish harpist Nicanor Zabaleta with the Philadelphia Orchestra, conducted by Eugene Ormandy.

2016, the centenary of the composer's birth, saw a number of performances including one by the French harpist Marie-Pierre Langlamet and the Berlin Philharmonic conducted by Juanjo Mena.

Instrumentation
Woodwinds
2 flutes (Flute 2 doubling piccolo)
2 oboes
2 clarinets in B
2 bassoons

Brass
2 horns in F
2 trumpets in C

Percussion
Timpani
Tambourine
Field drum
Cymbals
Xylophone
Celesta
Various items of Latin percussion

Strings
Harp
Violin I
Violin II
Violas
Cellos
Double basses

Movements
Allegro giusto
Molto moderato
Liberamente capriccioso - Vivace

See also
 List of compositions for harp

References

Sources
Ginastera, Alberto. "Harp Concerto. Op. 25." (Boosey & Hawkes, 1974).

Compositions by Alberto Ginastera
1956 compositions
Ginastera